Ben Keaton (born 1956) is an Irish actor who appeared in ITV soap opera Emmerdale as Jeff Brannigan, and in BBC's Casualty, playing the part of Spencer between 1999 and 2002. He also appeared as Father Austin Purcell in "Think Fast, Father Ted", an episode of the Channel 4 sitcom Father Ted, and had a small part in the British film East is East as a priest.

Keaton is also a well-established theatre actor, and has appeared at The Royal Exchange Theatre in Manchester in Animal Crackers, American Buffalo, Harvey, Cyrano de Bergerac, and playing the role of David Bliss in Noël Coward's Hay Fever. Keaton also works as a comedian, and has won the Perrier Comedy Award at the 1986 Edinburgh Festival, two Manchester Evening News Best Actor Awards and a Laurence Olivier Nomination. He is a regular guest member with the Comedy Store Players, the Steve Frost Improv All Stars and Eddie Izzard, and appeared in this style of comedy at the Royal Exchange in his show "Ben Keaton & Friends" which has included Stephen Frost, Niall Ashdown, Steve Steen, Andy Smart, Brian Conley and Paul Merton. He was a founder member of the improv group South Of The River with Jeremy Hardy and Kit Hollerbach, and set up The Phwoar Horsemen Improv Group in 2016 with Paul Mutagejja.

Keaton has written five series of Hubbub for the BBC and his own series, Gumtree, for Channel 4, which also aired his own 'special', Ben Keaton's Finest Half Hour. He wrote and directed the live arena production of Sky TV's Brainiac and went on to write and direct the Science Museum's first touring stage production.

Keaton began teaching at the University of Lincoln in 2008, where he specialises in Physical Theatre and Acting for Camera. In 2013, he set up Lincoln Film and Television School, teaching all aspects of filmmaking to young people.

In 2014, Keaton returned to the role of Father Austin Purcell, performing a stand-up routine and hosting pub quizzes entirely in character. Keaton also set up a Twitter page for the character, and a website where fans can purchase customised Father Austin Purcell video greetings.

In 2015 he set up Lincoln Comedy Academy with Paul Mutagejja to teach performing and writing comedy for stage and screen.

His documentary series The I Am Project records the lives of children who are moving from primary to secondary school and from secondary to further education, and has taken place in a variety of schools since 2008. The series has been admitted into the Media Archive of Central England.

In 2017 he and his son Waldo Fox Kennedy set up Bracket Energy Media Production, which produces video for business and specialises in online content.

Keaton lives in Lincolnshire.

Filmography

References

External links

1956 births
Irish acting coaches
Irish male film actors
Irish male stage actors
Irish male television actors
Irish stand-up comedians
Living people